Upmanu Lall is an Indian-American engineer who is the Alan and Carol Silberstein Professor of Engineering at Columbia University. He serves as Director of the Columbia Water Center. Lall studies water scarcity and how to predict and mitigate floods. He was named an American Geophysical Union Fellow in 2017 and their Walter Langbein Lecturer in 2022. He was elected a fellow of the American Association for the Advancement of Science in 2018, and has received the Arid Lands Hydrology and the Ven Te Chow Awards from the American Society of Civil Engineers. In April 2021 he was named to the “Hot List of the world’s 1,000 top climate scientists” by Reuters.

Early life and education 
Lall was born in 1956 in Dharamsala, Himanchal Pradesh, India. He studied Civil Engineering at IIT Kanpur, and graduated in 1976. He earned his Masters and Doctrate in Civil & Environmental Engineering from the University of Texas at Austin, in 1981. His doctoral research considered the value of data in uncertainty and risk. Lall was trained in hydrology and water resources, but recognized the importance of hydrologic systems analysis, statistics and climate dynamics. In the 1990s he got interested in climate change, nonlinear dynamics and applied functional analysis. These interests led to significant contributions in nonparametric function estimation, and  hydrologic predictability.

Research and career 
Lall works on hydrology and climate dynamics. He serves as the Director of the Columbia Water Center, where he looks at water scarcity, hydroclimatic extremes, infrastructure issues and risk. Lall developed a Global Flood Initiative, which looks to predict, manage and control floods from a global climate dynamics perspective, and aGlobal Water Sustainability Initiative, which concentrates on water scarcity and risks. He was one of the first to identify the significance of climate teleconnections (climate anomalies that are related to one another over long distances) in terrestrial hydrology. Lall's current work focuses on a research program called the America's Water initiative, which seeks to develop sustainable water management protocols, and strengthen resilience to the changing climate.

Lall has been involved in policy making and science communication, including providing expert insight at the World Economic Forum. He initiated the establishment of the Consortium of Universities for the Advancement of Hydrologic Science, and is Editor-in-Chief of the Elsevier journal Water Security.

Awards and honors 
 2011 American Society of Civil Engineers Arid Lands Hydrology Award
 2014 European Geosciences Union Henry Darcy Medal 
 2016 American Geophysical Union President of the Natural Hazards Focus Group
 2017 American Geophysical Union Fellow 
 2018 American Association for the Advancement of Science Fellow
 2021 Reuter's Hot List of the World's top 1000 climate scientists: 
 2022 American Geophysical Union Walter Langbein Lecture
 2023 American Society of Civil Engineers Ven Te Chow Award

Selected publications

See also 
 Indians in the New York City metropolitan area

References 

IIT Kanpur alumni
University of Texas at Austin alumni
Columbia University faculty
Indian emigrants to the United States
Earth scientists
Living people
1956 births